M. A. Rafey Habib is an academic humanities scholar and poet.

His published books are about  literary theory, T. S. Eliot, Urdu poetry,   translating the Quran, pacifism in Islam, and the philosophy of Georg Wilhelm Friedrich Hegel. He is currently Distinguished Professor in the Department of English at Rutgers University-Camden,

Works 
Habib's books include:
 Hegel and the Foundations of Literary Theory (2018)
 Hegel and Empire: From Postcolonialism to Globalism (2017)
 The Cambridge History of Literary Criticism: Volume 6, The Nineteenth Century, c.1830–1914 (2013)
 A Dictionary of Literary Terms and Literary Theory (revised 5th ed., 2012)
 Literary Criticism from Plato to the Present: An Introduction (2011)
 Shades of Islam: Poems for a New Century (2010)
 Modern Literary Criticism and Theory: A History (2008)
 A History of Literary Criticism: From Plato to the Present (2005)
 An Anthology of Modern Urdu Poetry: In English Translation (translated and edited, 2003)
 The Early T.S. Eliot and Western Philosophy (1999)
 The Dissident Voice: Poems of N.M. Ráshed (translated and edited, 1993)

References

External links
Rutgers home page

Living people
Year of birth missing (living people)
Rutgers University faculty
American academics of English literature